The Palazzo Viviani della Robbia is a Baroque-style palace located on Via de Tornabuoni #15, corner with Via della Spada, in the quartieri of Santa Maria Novella, city of Florence, region of Tuscany, Italy. 

The palace was commissioned by marchese Luigi Viviani, a counselor for Cosimo III Medici. It was designed by Giovanni Battista Foggini and completed in 1693.

References

Baroque architecture in Florence
Palaces in Florence